Bogy is a commune of the Ardèche department in southern France.

Geography

Population

The inhabitants are called Boginois.

See also
Communes of the Ardèche department

References

External links

Gazetteer Entry

Communes of Ardèche
Ardèche communes articles needing translation from French Wikipedia